The Aban Pearl was a twin-hull, column-stabilized, semi-submersible offshore drilling rig owned and operated by Aban Offshore drilling company. It is registered in Singapore. In 2009, the Aban Pearl became the first offshore gas rig operated by the Venezuela's state-owned oil company PDVSA. In May 2010, the rig sank into the sea though all workers aboard at the time were saved.

Background
The Aban Pearl was designed by Aker H-3 and was built in 1977 by Far East Levingston Shipbuilding (now part of the Keppel Corporation) at the Levingston Singapore shipyard.

History
In 1977–1996, she was named Transocean Seeker, in 1996 Treasure Seeker and in 1996–2000 Transocean Discoverer. All this time she was owned by Transocean. In 2000–2007, she was named Bulford Dolphin and operated under the Bahamas flag.  The Bulford Dolphin was purchased for US$43.27 million by Bonheur ASA and Ganger Rolf ASA. The rig was operated by Dolphin Drilling, a subsidiary of Fred. Olsen Energy.

Incidents
In 2006, while contracted by the Nigerian oil company Peak Petroleum, the rig was attacked near Nigeria by Nigerian militants and eight of the personnel on the rig were kidnapped. They were released unharmed after two days in captivity. In 2007, the rig was purchased by the Indian drilling company Aban for US$211 million.

In 2009, the rig was contracted under a five-year contract for PDVSA for drilling natural gas wells on the Mariscal Sucre complex off the coast of northeastern Venezuela in the Caribbean Sea.

On 13 May 2010 at 2:20 a.m. (0650 GMT), when drilling at the Dragon 6 gas field, scheduled to come on stream by 2012, the rig sank in the deep about  after water entered a subsea pontoon. All 95 crew members were evacuated from the rig to the nearby drilling ship Neptune Discoverer. According to the Venezuelan Energy Minister Rafael Ramirez, the well being explored by the Aban Pearl  had been safely sealed. The rig was one of the company's biggest money earners bringing in about $358,000 dollars, or about 10.5 million rupees a day. The insurance claim of $235 million was settled in July 2010.

See also
Deepwater Horizon oil spill

References

External links

 Rig Aban Pearl (Aban Offshore website) (PDF)

Ships built in Singapore
1977 ships
Semi-submersibles
Collapsed oil platforms
Maritime incidents in 2010
Ships of Singapore
Drilling rigs